Azi (fl. c. 2500 BC) is the name of a scribe from the kingdom of Ebla. His name has been found on a number of clay tablets, making possible an extrapolation of his career path.

Career
He began as a student and passed examinations to become a scribe. He was a highly competent teacher, known from his title, dub-zu-zu, or "one who knows the tablets." Finally, he became a top administrator in the kingdom.

Sources

References

Ebla
Ancient Near Eastern scribes
Writing teachers
Syrian educators
25th-century BC people
Year of birth unknown
Year of death unknown